The Connecticut State Department of Education is a branch of the state government of Connecticut in the United States. The agency is headquartered at 450 Columbus Boulevard in Hartford.  The department, under the supervision of the Connecticut State Board of Education, oversees public education in the state, distribute funds to the state's 166 school districts, and operates the Connecticut Technical High School System.

References

External links

 Connecticut State Department of Education
 

 
Education
State departments of education of the United States